"Sing" is the debut single by Theo Tams, the winner of season 6 of Canadian Idol.

Background
The song was written by Rob Wells (who has also written songs for Melissa O'Neil, Nick Lachey, Backstreet Boys, and Eva Avila) and Xandy Barry. The single was produced by Gavin Brown.

Release
It was released for digital downloads on September 11, 2008, and then the next week it made a "Hot Shot Debut" at number 12 on the Canadian Hot 100 chart due to digital downloads.

The track is included as a bonus track on Tams' 2009 album debut, Give It All Away.

Reception

References

2008 singles
Canadian pop songs
Songs written by Rob Wells
2008 songs
Sony BMG singles